The 1925–26 Iowa State Cyclones men's basketball team (also known informally as Ames) represented Iowa State University during the 1925-26 NCAA College men's basketball season. The Cyclones were coached by Bill Chandler, who was in his fifth season with the Cyclones. They played their home games at the State Gymnasium in Ames, Iowa.

They finished the season 4–14, 3–11 in Missouri Valley Intercollegiate Athletic Association play to finish in ninth place.

Roster

Schedule and results 

|-
!colspan=6 style=""|Regular Season

|-

References 

Iowa State Cyclones men's basketball seasons
Iowa State
Iowa State Cyc
Iowa State Cyc